LA-44 is a constituency of Azad Kashmir Legislative Assembly which is currently represented by Muhammad Ahmad Raza Qadri of Pakistan Muslim League (N). It covers the area of Attock District Rawalpindi District (except Rawalpindicity) Islamabad in Pakistan. Only refugees from Kashmir Valley settled in Pakistan are eligible to vote.

Election 2016 

elections were held in this constituency on 21 July 2016.

Election 2021 
Further Information: Azad Kashmir Election 2021Muhammad Ahmad Raza Qadri of Pakistan Muslim League (N) won this seat by obtaining 20278 votes.

References

Azad Kashmir Legislative Assembly constituencies